Brooklyn Italians is an American soccer team based in Brooklyn, New York City, New York, United States. Founded in 1949, the team last played in the National Premier Soccer League (NPSL), a national amateur league at the fourth tier of the American Soccer Pyramid, in the Northeast Atlantic Division during its 2019 season.

The team plays its home games at the stadium on the campus of John Dewey High School. The team's colors are white and blue.

History
The Brooklyn Italians are generally regarded as one of the most successful semi-pro teams in the United States, with a linear history that now stretches back over 60 years. Founded in 1949 by John DeVivo, an Italian immigrant to the New York area, the team was originally part of the Metropolitan Soccer League in the early 1950s, before joining the American Soccer League prior to the 1956–57 season. The Italians finished seventh in their first season in the ASL behind champions New York Hakoah.

The Italians changed their name to the Inter-Brooklyn Italians when they merged with a local rival club in 1961, became Inter SC in 1962, and before the 1963 season the team changed its name again and became Boca Juniors, named after the famous club in Argentina, but played just one season with this name before resigning from the ASL in 1964.

For the next 20 years or so the team continued to play in amateur leagues under various names – at one time or another were they known as Palermo Football Club and the Brooklyn Dodgers (after the former Brooklyn baseball team) – before reverting to their original name in 1991. They were also regular participants in the National Challenge Cup, winning the title twice during the pre-MLS all-amateur era, in 1979 (when they were still called the Dodgers) and 1991, and reaching the final in 1981 and 1990.

As a result of their success in the 1990 tournament, the Italians played in the qualifying rounds of the 1991 CONCACAF Champions' Cup. In April 1991, they beat Bermudian side Dandy Town Hornets 4–3 on aggregate; they withdrew before the second round of the tournament. In November 1991 they lost 6–1 on aggregate to Club Universidad de Guadalajara in the first round of the 1991 CONCACAF Cup Winners Cup.

The Italians joined the National Premier Soccer League in 2010, with head coach Joe Barone calling it "a new adventure".

In addition to the new NPSL side, the Italians continue to field a number of teams in the New York-based Cosmopolitan Soccer League. The Italians also regularly compete in various amateur tournaments world-wide, including the Memorial Claudio Sassi in Italy, the Dallas Cup, the President's Day Tournament in Phoenix, and college showcases across the country. International travel is encouraged, and teams have trained with many of the elite teams from Italy.

In 2020, the team was not listed among the clubs taking part in the 2020 NPSL season.

On May 5, 2021, the New York Red Bulls announced the Italians as an official Academy Affiliate.

Year-by-year

Team names
 Brooklyn Italians (1949–1961)
 Inter-Brooklyn Italians (1961–1962)
 Inter SC (1962–1963)
 Boca Juniors (1963–1964)
 Brooklyn Dodgers / Palermo Football Club (varying names) (1964–1991)
 Brooklyn Italians (1991–present)

Honors
 National Challenge Cup: 
 Champions: 1979, 1991
 Runners-up: 1981, 1990
 American Soccer League:
 Runners-up: 1961–62, 1962–63
 North Eastern Super Soccer League: 
 Champions: 1990
 Runners-up: 1991
 Cosmopolitan Soccer League: 
 League Champions: 1976–1977, 1977–1978, 1980–1981, 1983–1984, 2005–2006, 2006–2007
 Indoor Tournament Champions: 1977, 1984, 1985
 National Premier Soccer League Atlantic Division: 
 Champions: 2011, 2013
Participation in CONCACAF Champions' Cup: 1980, 1982, 1991
Participation in CONCACAF Cup Winners Cup: 1991

Head coaches
  Mike Ryback (1989–1991)
  Gilbert Godoy (1991–1992)
  Joe Barone (2009–2010)
  Tony Noto (2010–2011)
  Lucio Russo (2011–2017)
  Dominic Casciato (2017–Present)

Stadium
 Brooklyn College; Brooklyn, New York City (1989–1992)
 Dreier Offermann Park; Brooklyn, New York City (2009)
 John Dewey High School; Brooklyn, New York City (2010–present)

See also
 Soccer in New York City

References

External links
 Official Site

Men's soccer clubs in New York (state)
Cosmopolitan Soccer League
American Soccer League (1933–1983) teams
National Premier Soccer League teams
1949 establishments in New York City
Italian-American culture in New York City
Sports in Brooklyn
Soccer clubs in New York City
Association football clubs established in 1949
Diaspora soccer clubs in the United States
Italian association football clubs outside Italy
U.S. clubs in CONCACAF Champions' Cup
U.S. clubs in CONCACAF Cup Winners' Cup
U.S. Open Cup winners